is a former Nippon Professional Baseball outfielder and the current coach of the Tohoku Rakuten Golden Eagles.

External links

1957 births
Living people
Baseball people from Ishikawa Prefecture
Japanese baseball players
Nippon Professional Baseball outfielders
Seibu Lions players
Hanshin Tigers players
Yakult Swallows players
Managers of baseball teams in Japan